The 1986 FA Charity Shield (also known as the General Motors – FA Charity Shield for sponsorship reasons) was the 64th Charity Shield, a football match contested by the holders of the Football League First Division and FA Cup. This edition featured a Merseyside derby between Liverpool and Everton at Wembley Stadium. Liverpool achieved a First Division and FA Cup double in 1985–86 so they faced Everton who finished as runners-up in the League. The match was played on 16 August 1986.

Adrian Heath opened the scoring for Everton in the 80th minute when he ran in on goal to shoot right footed to the left of the goalkeeper from six yards. Ian Rush equalised in the 88th minute when he side footed to the net from six yards after a low cross from the right. The match finished 1–1. The two clubs shared the title, each having held the shield for six months.

Match details

See also
1985–86 Football League
1985–86 FA Cup

References

External links
LFC History Article on the match

1986
Charity Shield 1986
Charity Shield 1986
Comm